Christopher James Steel (born 15 May 1986) is an Australian politician. He has been a Labor member of the Australian Capital Territory Legislative Assembly since 2016, representing the electorate of Murrumbidgee and currently serves as a Cabinet Minister in the ACT Government. Before his election, Steel was an education advocate working in the early childhood sector.

Biography

Steel was born in Newcastle, New South Wales before his family moved to Canberra in the 1980s. As a child he grew up on the Southside in Torrens attending the local public schools, Torrens Primary, Melrose High School and Narrabundah College. He completed his Bachelor of Laws (LLB) and Bachelor of Arts (BA) at the Australian National University (ANU). Prior to his election into the ACT Legislative Assembly, Steel worked as the Policy and Research Manager at peak education advocacy group Early Childhood Australia. He has also worked as a policy adviser for both the Australian Government and Australian Capital Territory Government. Prior to being elected to office, Steel volunteered as a Director on the Board of YMCA Canberra. Steel currently lives in Kambah with his partner Kurt.

Political career

On 16 October 2016 Steel was elected to the Ninth Assembly to represent the new electorate of Murrumbidgee receiving 9.1% of the vote. Steel was re-elected at the 2020 ACT Election with 13.8% of the vote.

Steel was appointed to Ministry on 27 August 2018 as Minister for City Services, Minister for Roads, Minister for Community Services and Community Facilities, and Minister for Multicultural Affairs. On 1 July 2019 he took on responsibility for the Transport portfolio following Meegan Fitzharris' resignation from the Ministry.

Following the 2020 ACT Election Steel was subsequently re-appointed to the Third Barr Ministry as Minister for Transport and City Services, Minister for Skills, and as Special Minister of State.

See also

 2016 Australian Capital Territory general election
 Members of the Australian Capital Territory Legislative Assembly, 2016–2020
 List of LGBTI holders of political offices in Australia

References

Living people
Australian Labor Party members of the Australian Capital Territory Legislative Assembly
Members of the Australian Capital Territory Legislative Assembly
Gay politicians
LGBT legislators in Australia
Australian LGBT rights activists
People from Newcastle, New South Wales
Australian National University alumni
21st-century Australian politicians
1986 births
People educated at Narrabundah College
YMCA leaders
21st-century Australian LGBT people